Billie Jean King was the defending champion.

Second-seeded Hana Mandlíková won the title, defeating unseeded Bettina Bunge in the final 6–4, 6–4.

Seeds
A champion seed is indicated in bold text while text in italics indicates the round in which that seed was eliminated. 

  Tracy Austin (withdrew)
  Hana Mandlíková (champion)
  Barbara Jordan (semifinals)
  Mima Jaušovec (semifinals)

Draw

Final

References

External links
 Main draw

Virginia Slims of Houston
1981 WTA Tour